Megalodicopia is a genus of tunicates belonging to the family Octacnemidae.

The species of this genus are found in Pacific Ocean.

Species:

Megalodicopia hians 
Megalodicopia rineharti

References

Tunicates